Apodimorphae is a clade of strisorean birds that include the extant families Trochilidae (hummingbirds), Hemiprocnidae (treeswifts), Apodidae (swifts), and Aegothelidae (owlet-nightjars), as well as many fossil families. This grouping of birds has been supported in a variety of recent studies. There are two higher classification schemes that have been proposed for the apodimorph families. One is all strisorean birds are classified in the order Caprimulgiformes, while the other is the strisorean birds are split into several distinct orders. In this case Apodimorphae is a subclade of Strisores that includes the orders Aegotheliformes (only including the owlet-nightjars of Australasia) and the Apodiformes (the swifts, treeswifts, and hummingbirds which have a global distribution). A similar name for the group Daedalornithes has been used for the owlet-night-apodiform clade, there is a difference between the two names with Apodimorphae defined as the total-group (the most inclusive clade including Aegotheles cristatus and Apus apus but not Caprimulgus europaeus, Steatornis caripensis, Nyctibius grandis, or Podargus strigoides) and Daedalornithes defined as the crowned group (the least inclusive clade including Aegotheles cristatus and Apus apus).

References

Neognathae